The Saxophones of Sonny Stitt is an  album by saxophonist Sonny Stitt, released in 1959 on the Roost label.

Reception
AllMusic awarded the album 3 stars.

Track listing 
All compositions by Sonny Stitt except as indicated
 "Happy Faces" - 3:40 
 "Am I Blue?" (Harry Akst, Grant Clarke) - 2:57  
 "I'll Be Seeing You" (Irving Kahal, Sammy Fain) - 2:05  
 "When You're Smiling" (Larry Shay, Mark Fisher, Joe Goodwin) - 3:34 
 "In a Little Spanish Town" (Mabel Wayne, Sam M. Lewis, Joe Young) - 4:00 
 "Them There Eyes" (Maceo Pinkard, Doris Tauber, William Tracey) - 3:42 
 "Back in Your Own Back Yard" (Al Jolson, Billy Rose, Dave Dreyer) - 3:26 
 "Foot Tapper" - 3:05 
 "Sometimes I Feel Like a Motherless Child" (Traditional) - 2:44 
 "Shadow Waltz" (Harry Warren, Al Dubin) - 2:08 
 "Wind-Up" - 3:35

Personnel 
Sonny Stitt - alto saxophone 3,5,8 and 11, tenor saxophone
Jimmy Jones - piano
Unknown musician - bass
Charlie Persip - drums

References 

1958 albums
Roost Records albums
Sonny Stitt albums
Albums produced by Teddy Reig